The chiselmouth (Acrocheilus alutaceus) is an unusual cyprinid fish of western North America. It is named for the sharp hard plate on its lower jaw, which is used to scrape rocks for algae. It is the sole member of the monotypic genus Acrocheilus and is a close relative of the Gila western chubs.

Description 
The chiselmouth's body plan generally follows the standard cyprinid form, generally elongated and slightly compressed. The snout is very blunt, with the lower jaw's plate (which consists of cornified epithelium) jutting out slightly. Coloration is rather drab, dark brown above and lighter lower down. Many individuals also have a pattern of black dots, and younger fish may have a dark area at the base of the tail. The single dorsal fin has 10 soft rays, while the anal fin and well-developed pelvic fins each have 9-10 rays. Chiselmouths can reach a length of 30 cm (12 in).

Distribution and habitat 
Chiselmouths are typically found in warmer parts of streams and rivers in the drainages of the Columbia River, Fraser River, and the Harney-Malheur system of the Great Basin. Some are found in lakes, migrating into streams to spawn. Although abundant in many parts of their range, behavior remains little-known. Chiselmouth were among the fishes typically utilized by the Nez Perce people as food.

Diet 
Young fish feed on surface insects. When the chisel develops (at around 0.6 inches length), they shift to scraping, making short darting movements at the substrate to dislodge whatever is on it, and sucking it in. Although they consume filamentous algae, it seems to not be digested much despite a long coiled intestine, and their primary food actually consists of diatoms.

References
 
  (1987): Fishes of the Great Basin: 149–151. University of Nevada Press, Reno.
  (1997): Phylogenetic Relationships of the Creek Chubs and the Spine-Fins: an Enigmatic Group of North American Cyprinid Fishes (Actinopterygii: Cyprinidae). Cladistics 13(3): 187–205.  (HTML abstract)

Leuciscinae
Chubs (fish)
Fauna of Western Canada
Fish of the Western United States
Fish described in 1855
Freshwater fish of the United States
Taxobox binomials not recognized by IUCN 

nl:Acrocheilus